Wayne Quilliam (born 1963) is an Aboriginal Australian photographic artist, curator, and cultural adviser based in Melbourne. He specializes in portraits and landscapes.

Early life 
Qulliam was born in Hobart, Tasmania, and raised in the suburbs. As a child he spent time in the bush around the Great Lakes and Central Tasmania, where he learned about the land from his uncles and grandfather. However, he was otherwise disconnected from his aboriginal culture.

Career 
Quilliam joined the Royal Australian Navy in 1979, at the age of 15. He acquired his first camera at the age of 17 in 1980 while stationed in Hong Kong.

When Quilliam was 21, he bought dark-room equipment from a customer whose chimney he was sweeping.

He later worked at an aboriginal newspaper, the Koori Mail.

He teaches as an adjunct professor at RMIT University in the School of Media and Communication.

Work
Quilliam's work includes documenting significant Indigenous events over the past 20 years, including the Sorry speech, 1967 Referendum anniversary, Garma, Laura, Burunga, Dreaming and Yeperenye festivals, and thousands of community events throughout the country. He has estimated that he has visited between 300 and 400 aboriginal communities. 

Wayne works with Indigenous groups in Cuba, Mexico, Bolivia, Vietnam, Laos, Cambodia, Indonesia and Guam, developing intercultural art and cultural exchanges with the vision of creating global exhibitions.

His ‘Lowanna’ series infuses textures of earth onto the human form, while his ‘Towindri’ landscape art and ‘Smoke’ exhibition explores the cultural significance of smoking ceremonies.

He is the official photographer for the Garma Festival of Traditional Cultures in Arnhem Land.

Exhibitions
Quilliam has held solo exhibitions in Havana, Tokyo, Mexico City, Caracas, New York City and Los Angeles, Berlin, Sydney, Melbourne, Adelaide, Perth and featured at the United Nations, New York. Representing Australia at G’Day LA where his art was seen by more than 20 million people on USA television followed by opening a solo show in New York a week later.  It is estimated his photographic exhibition of the ‘Apology’, ‘Sorry more than a Word’ that opened at Parliament House in Canberra has been experienced by more than a quarter of a million people and continues to attract large audiences as it travels the world.

These shows continue his international successes from the Museum of Young Art, Vienna, several galleries in Berlin, Cologne, Düsseldorf, Hamburg as well as Russia, Guam, Indonesia and numerous galleries in Australia.  His ‘Towindri’ exhibition in Cairo attracted critical acclaim toured Riyadh and Beirut in 2014.

 Shades of Black (late 2004 - January 2005); Kluge-Ruhe Gallery, Virginia, United States
 HOME (2012); Wyndham Art Gallery, Wyndham City, Victoria
 Instaculture (July-August 2019); amBUSH Gallery, Sydney, New South Wales
 DJIWARR (April-August 2020)
 Earth Burns, Water Cries (July-September 2021); Venetian Media Group, South Yarra, Victoria

Personal life 
Quilliam is "a freshwater man from the central highlands of Tasmania". He has been with his wife, Jodie, since the early 2000s. The couple have a daughter, Tanisha.

Books 

 Culture is Life (2021); Hardie Grant

Awards
He has won AIMSC Business of the Year, and been nominated as a Master of Photography by National Geographic. He was a finalist in the PrixPictet in Paris and in the Bowness Art Award.  
2008 Human Rights Media Award 
2008 Walkley Award
2009 NAIDOC Artist of the Year
2019 Survival International 2020 Calendar Photo Competition
2022 National Photographic Portrait Prize

References

External links 
Quilliam's website

Australian photographers
Living people
Year of birth missing (living people)
Indigenous Tasmanian people